The Villagers is a 2018 South Korean action thriller film directed by Im Jin-sun, starring Ma Dong-seok and Kim Sae-ron. It was released on November 7, 2018.

Plot
Gi-cheol, a former boxing champion, is appointed as a PE teacher at an all girls’s high school in a small village, where a student named Han Soo-Yeon had recently gone missing. The girl’s disappearance is largely a mystery, but Gi-cheol feels strange things about the town after his arrival as all the villagers seem uptight and highly agitated. 

After he gets acquainted with one student, Yoo-jin, when he finds her skipping out on class at afternoon to go look for Soo-Yeon, who is her best friend, Gi-cheol realizes that Yoo-jin is actually the only person in the entire town, who seems to care about finding the missing school girl and finds that many girls are missing in the village with the police not caring about the case. Gi-cheol writes a letter to issue a search warrant and begins the investigation with his friend Inspector Dong-soo. 

Gi-cheol also finds cameras in the girl's toilet when he finds some girls were smoking tobacco at the toilet and finds the art teacher Ji-Sung was actually Soo-Yeon's kidnapper after he check his text messages between him and Soo-Yeon and also finds that Ji-Sung is about to meet Yoo-jin, who rushes to save her. Yoo-jin (after Gi-cheol had told her about Ji-Sung's involvement in Soo-Yeon's kidnapping) questions Ji-Sung about his involvement in Soo-Yeon's kidnapping, to which he knocks her unconscious and takes her to his house. 

Gi-cheol receives Ji-Sung's address from Yoo-jin and arrives at the house, where he knocks  and interrogates him. Ji-Sung explains that Soo-Yeon had called him to pick her up and Soo-Yeon told Ji-Sung to leave her at a petrol bunk as someone will arrive to pick her up. Ji-Sung drops her and leaves, but feels uneasy for having left her alone and finds her disappeared, only for him to find her cell-phone. After the confession, Yoo-jin calls the police and Ji-Sung is held into custody. The police chief is revealed to be in cahoots with the kidnapper. 

Later, Gi-cheol receives a call from Dong-Soo, who reveals that they found Soo-Yeon's corpse, which leaves Yoo-jin devastated. The Police Chief finds Dong-soo's involvement in case investigation and calls the kidnapper. Dong-Soo checks Soo-Yeon's phone and finds her chat conversation with Lee Seul, who is the madam of a club named Janus which he reports to Gi-cheol and is knocked unconscious by someone. Gi-cheol leaves for Janus club to meet Lee Seul, who reveals that Soo-Yeon was a part time singer at the club where she was misbehaved by the club's bar owner, where she attacked him and escaped. 

Gi-cheol interrogates Gwak-Sajang, who is the owner of the club after he defeats his henchmen. Sajang reveals that Ji-Sung was the one who killed Soo-Yeon as Ji-Sung had loved Soo-Yeon, but had rejected her advances and also Ji-Sung is actually a politician Ki-Tae's son. Gi-cheol reports it to Dong-Soo, who learns that Ji-Sung is released and deduce that Yoo-jin is also in danger. Ji-Sung kidnaps Yoo-jin and takes her to another location where he hides her in a closet. Ki-Tae arrives and tells Ji-Sung to leave for US. 

Ji-Sung reveals that Ki-Tae himself was actually Soo-Yeon's killer. Ki-Tae had chocked Soo-Yeon to death to save his political career and reputation due to Ji-Sung's antics. Later, Yoo-jin tries to escape from Ji-Sung and is severely wounded before Gi-cheol reaches the hideout and knocks him where he learns Ki-tae's true colors. Gi-cheol admits Yu-jin to the hospital and Ki-tae wins the election and is elected as the Governor. 

Furious, Gi-cheol attacks Ki-Tae's convey at night. With Dong-Soo's help, Gi-cheol reveals Ki-Tae and the police chief's involvement in Soo-Yeon's murder to the media where Ki-Tae and the police chief are stripped of their respective positions and are arrested. Gi-cheol visits Yu-jin at the hospital, who thanks him for solving her friend's disappearance. Gi-cheol leaves for another village to start a new life

Cast
Ma Dong-seok as Yeok Gi-cheol
Kim Sae-ron as Kang Yoo-jin 
Lee Sang-yeob as Ji Sung 
Jang Gwang as Ki-tae
Oh Hee-joon as Dong-soo 
Jin Seon-kyu as Byung-doo
Shin Se-hwi as Han Soo-yeon

Production 
Filming began July 21, 2017 and finished September 30, 2017.

Release 
The film was released on November 7, 2018, alongside Goosebumps 2: Haunted Halloween, Ode to the Goose (November 8), and The Wrath (November 8).

Reception 
Yoon Min-sik from The Korea Herald gave a mixed review and wrote, "The Villagers has an interesting premise, a promising set-up, good acting and a strong first act -- but maybe not enough thrill, and bit of a letdown in the third act."

References

External links
 
 
 

2018 films
2010s Korean-language films
South Korean action thriller films
2018 action thriller films
2010s South Korean films